Jomaine Ellay Consbruch (born 26 January 2002) is a German professional footballer who plays as a midfielder for  club Arminia Bielefeld.

Career
After beginning his youth career with SV Ubbedissen, Consbruch joined the youth academy of Arminia Bielefeld in 2009. He briefly returned to Ubbedissen for the 2011–12 season before again joining Bielefeld's youth team.

Consbruch made his professional debut for Bielefeld in the 2. Bundesliga on 29 July 2019, coming on as a substitute in the 86th minute for Stephan Salger in the home match against FC St. Pauli, which finished as a 1–1 draw.

References

External links
 
 
 

2002 births
Living people
Sportspeople from Bielefeld
Footballers from North Rhine-Westphalia
German footballers
Association football midfielders
Germany youth international footballers
Arminia Bielefeld players
Eintracht Braunschweig players
2. Bundesliga players
3. Liga players
21st-century German people